is a Japanese ultramarathon runner and women's winner of the 2013 IAU 24 Hour World Championship. Kudo holds the women's world record in the 24-hour run on the track and road,
and also the 48-hour run road discipline.

In December 2011 Kudo reset her own 24-hour world record by running 255.303 km at the Soochow International 24 hour race in Taiwan. On 11–12 May 2013, Kudo won the IAU female 24-hour Road World Championship, setting a new world record of 24 hour Road.

Kudo was selected as the Athlete of the Year by IAU for the years of 2012 and 2013.

World records 
Women's 24 hour Track, 254.425 km (158.092 mi),  Taipei,  12–13 Dec 2009
Women's 48 hour Road, 368.687 km (229.091 mi), Athens,  8–10 Apr 2011

International competitions

References

1964 births
Living people
Japanese ultramarathon runners
Japanese female long-distance runners
Japanese female marathon runners
Female ultramarathon runners